Exclusive is a digital EP by the Irish rock band U2, released exclusively on the iTunes Store in 2003. The EP was the band's first digital-only release.

Track listing
Music by U2, words by Bono and The Edge.

The acoustic version of "Stuck in a Moment You Can't Get Out Of" was mixed by Steve Lillywhite. It was previously available on the Canadian "Stuck in a Moment" single and the European and Australian "Walk On" single in 2001. It was also available on the U.S. only EP, 7.

The two live tracks were recorded during an Elevation Tour show in Boston, Massachusetts on 6 June 2001. This show was also filmed for and released as the Elevation 2001: Live from Boston DVD in 2001.

Personnel
Bono – lead vocals, guitar (track 2)
The Edge – guitar, vocals
Adam Clayton – bass guitar (except on track 1)
Larry Mullen, Jr. – drums (except on track 1)

See also
U2 discography

References

External links
Exclusive at U2 Wanderer, with comprehensive details on various editions, cover scans, lyrics, and more

2003 EPs
ITunes-exclusive releases
Live EPs
U2 EPs
U2 live albums
2003 live albums
Albums produced by Daniel Lanois
Albums produced by Brian Eno